Kristine Tornquist (born 1965, Graz) is an Austrian librettist, director and visual artist.

She was born in Graz, grew up in Linz, and trained as a goldsmith. She has a diploma (1994) from the University of Applied Arts Vienna, where she studied under Ron Arad.

She has written about 50 opera librettos.

References

External links
 List of Tornquist's opera librettos

Living people
1965 births
Musicians from Graz
Writers from Graz
University of Applied Arts Vienna alumni
Austrian librettists
Austrian directors